FC Baltimore Christos (founded as FC Baltimore 1729) was an American soccer team based in Baltimore, Maryland, United States. Founded in 2018, the team played in the National Premier Soccer League (NPSL), a national amateur league at the fourth tier of the American Soccer Pyramid, in the Mid Atlantic Conference of the Northeast Region.

The team played its home games at Marriotts Ridge High School.

On November 5, 2018, the team announced a partnership with Christos FC and altered its official name from FC Baltimore 1729 to FC Baltimore Christos.
Following the 2021 NPSL season in which the team made the National Finals, they announced they would move to the USL League 2 from 2022. They also rebranded as simply Christos FC.

Current roster

Record

Year-by-year

References

National Premier Soccer League teams
Soccer clubs in Baltimore
Association football clubs established in 2018
2018 establishments in Maryland